Electric Highway is the fifth mixtape by American rapper Rockie Fresh, it was released on January 21, 2013.
The mixtape features guest appearances from Lunice, Rick Ross, Nipsey Hussle, Sasha Go Hard and Currensy. The mixtape is hosted by DJ Ill Will.

Background 
Aside from a handful of appearances on Rick Ross’ mixtape The Black Bar Mitzvah, Rockie Fresh was relatively quiet after signing with MMG. With Driving 88 release the Chicago rapper took this time to season his abilities, and Electric Highway was called "a clear reflection of what Rockie sets out to achieve." The mixtape has been downloaded over 250,000 times on DatPiff, that making the mixtape platinum certified.

Music videos

On December 6, 2012 the music video for "Nobody" was released.

The second music video was released on January 21, 2013 for "The Warnings". It was directed by Ryan Snyder and Spiff TV.

After the release of the mixtape. The third and last music video was released on May 13, 2013, for "Life Long"  featuring Rick Ross and Nipsey Hussle. Dre Films directed the video. The video also features cameos from Gunplay, Stalley and Meek Mill.

Track listing

Release history

References

2013 mixtape albums
Rockie Fresh albums